is a 2006 Japanese film. It was directed by director Keita Kono, and stars  actors Takao Osawa, Yasuko Matsuyuki, Arashi Fukasawa and Ryoko Kobayashi in lead roles. It was released in Japanese cinemas on 18 March 2006.

Helen the Baby Fox tells the story of Taichi and a fox cub, whom Taichi found by the side of the road. The cub is blind, deaf and mute and Taichi names it Helen, after Helen Keller who suffers from similar disabilities. They faced much skepticism and criticism from the people around them, and difficulties stemming from Helen's physical disabilities.

Plot
Leaving school for the day, seven-year-old Taichi finds a baby fox, abandoned by her mother alongside a road in rural Hokkaido. The two bond and Taichi decides to leave the cub with the police as a lost item. The policeman on duty takes a reluctant Taichi and the cub to the local Yajima Veterinary Clinic. It turns out that Taichi has begun to live with Ko, the vet, and his teenage daughter Misuzu after his free-spirited mother Ritsuko has gone to Micronesia to work as a photographer. Many people have abandoned animals with Ko, and paying customers are few with most of his income coming from frequently boarding a friendly dog that is almost part of the family. Taichi feels abandoned as well, and clashes with Ko when the vet sees the new arrival as a burden, especially after discovering that the cub is deaf and blind. However, Taichi names her Helen after Helen Keller and attempts to bring her back to full health while teaching her about the world as sort of a young Annie Sullivan. Even though Taichi gets her to eat, Helen suffers increasing fits stemming from her brain, which is the result of a tumor.

Cast 
 Arashi Fukasawa as 
 Yasuko Matsuyuki as 
 Takao Osawa as 
 Ryoko Kobayashi as 
 Shunji Fujimura as Professor Uehara
 Chiaki Ozaki as 
 Kazuya Satō as 
 Hideko Yoshida as an old woman
 Ryoko Tanami as 
 Sadao Abe as a Police officer
 Raiki Yonemoto

Release
It was first released in Japanese cinemas on 18 March 2006. It was also released in Singapore cinemas on 27 July 2006 by local distributor Shaw Organization.

References

External links
 
 Helen the baby fox at Love HK Film

2006 films
2000s Japanese-language films
Films about foxes
Shochiku films